Alpha Centauri is the second studio album by German electronic music group Tangerine Dream. It was released in March 1971 by record label Ohr.

Content 

The music on this album is quite different from Tangerine Dream's first album Electronic Meditation, partly because of a heavier reliance on keyboards and electronic technology, although they still mostly remain in the background: the dominant instruments on the album are organ and flute. The other difference is that this album focuses on dark, spacey soundscapes as opposed to jam sessions. The shift in instrumentation resulted in an atmosphere dubbed by Edgar Froese himself as "kosmische musik". Julian Cope's Head Heritage wrote that the album "used the space rock template from [Pink Floyd's] Saucerful of Secrets (and removed the rock)".

A nowadays extremely rare single "Ultima Thule" was released in February of the same year. Side 1 employs the same guitar riff as "Fly and Collision of Comas Sola", but the single was at the time otherwise an unconnected release. Re-releases of Alpha Centauri in the 2000s have however included either or both parts of Ultima Thule as bonus tracks.

Release 

Alpha Centauri was released in March 1971 by record label Ohr. It sold 20,000 copies in their native Germany, nearly four times as many as their later classic Phaedra.

Track listing

Personnel 
 Edgar Froese – guitar, organ, bass, composer
 Christopher Franke – drums, percussion, flute, zither, piano, VCS3
 Steve Schroyder – organ, voice, echo machines, iron stick
 Udo Dennebourg – flute, voice
 Roland Paulick – synthesizer

References

External links 
 

1971 albums
Krautrock albums
Space music albums by German artists
Tangerine Dream albums
Ohr (record label) albums
Albums produced by Edgar Froese
Albums produced by Christopher Franke